Azimio is an administrative ward in the Temeke district of the Dar es Salaam Region of Tanzania.

In 2016 the Tanzania National Bureau of Statistics report there were 96,212 people in the ward, from 76,832 in 2012, from 61,182 in 2002. The ward has .

References

Temeke District
Wards of Dar es Salaam Region